The gastric inhibitory polypeptide receptor (GIP-R), also known as the glucose-dependent insulinotropic polypeptide receptor, is a protein that in humans is encoded by the GIPR gene. GIP-R is a member of the 7-transmembrane protein family, a class of G protein coupled receptors. GIP-R is found on beta-cells in the pancreas where it serves as the receptor for the hormone Gastric inhibitory polypeptide (GIP).

Function 

Gastric inhibitory polypeptide, also called glucose-dependent insulinotropic polypeptide, is a 42-amino acid polypeptide synthesized by K cells of the duodenum and small intestine. It was originally identified as an activity in gut extracts that inhibited gastric acid secretion and gastrin release, but subsequently was demonstrated to stimulate insulin release potently in the presence of elevated glucose. The insulinotropic effect on pancreatic islet beta-cells was then recognized to be the principal physiologic action of GIP. Together with glucagon-like peptide-1, GIP is largely responsible for the secretion of insulin after eating. It is involved in several other facets of the anabolic response.

References

Further reading

External links

 

G protein-coupled receptors